This timeline of Devonian research is a chronological listing of events in the history of geology and paleontology focused on the study of earth during the span of time lasting from 419.2 to 358.9 million years ago and the legacies of this period in the rock and fossil records.

19th century

1844
 Agassiz described the new genus Pterygotus.

1859
 Dawson described the new genus Prototaxites .

1881
 Whiteaves described the new genus Eusthenopteron.

1889
 Newberry described the new genus Stethacanthus.

1894
 Dean described the new genus Cladoselache.

20th century

1932
 Säve-Söderbergh described the new genus Ichthyostega.

1937
 W. H. Lang described the new genus Cooksonia.

1952
 Jarvik described the new genus and species Acanthostega gunnari.

1956
 Lehman described the new genus Dunkleosteus.

1968
 Thomson described the new genus Hyneria.

21st century

2006
 Daeschler, Shubin & Jenkins described the new genus Tiktaalik.

2010
 Gonez and Gerrienne emended genus Cooksonia described by W. H. Lang in 1937.

See also

 History of paleontology
 Timeline of paleontology
 Timeline of Cambrian research
 Timeline of Ordovician research
 Timeline of Silurian research
 Timeline of Carboniferous research
 Timeline of Permian research

References

Devonian
Devonian